Persal stands for Persatuan Sepakbola Aceh Selatan (en: Football Association of South Aceh). Persal South Aceh is an Indonesian football club based in South Aceh Regency, Aceh. The club played in Liga 3.

References

External links
Liga-Indonesia.co.id

Football clubs in Indonesia
Football clubs in Aceh
Association football clubs established in 1956
1956 establishments in Indonesia